Meyuns is the second most populous city in the tiny Pacific island nation of Palau, with a population of approximately 1,000. Meyuns is comparable in population to Palau's third largest city, Airai. It is located in the State of Koror, where the nation's largest city, also called Koror, is located. Other than Koror, Meyuns is the only sizable town in the state of Koror. Unlike the city of Koror, Meyuns is on Ngerekebesang Island, along with the towns of Ngerekebesang and Echang, although Meyuns is the only town that is incorporated on the island. It is linked by a causeway to Oreor Island, where the city of Koror is situated. Meyuns is the location of Belau National Hospital, the largest hospital in the country.

Education
The Ministry of Education operates public schools.

Meyuns Elementary School was built circa 1969 and expanded in 1973. It was established since Typhoon Sally destroyed Koror Elementary School in Koror, where Meyuns students previously attended. The Trust Territory of the Pacific Islands administration was previously uninterested in building a school in Melyuns.

Palau High School in Koror is the country's only public high school, so children from this community go there.

References

Populated places in Palau
Koror